Shabab Rural District is a rural district (dehestan) in the Shabab District of Chardavol County, Ilam Province, Iran. At the 2006 census, its population was 7,420, in 1,554 families.  The rural district has 15 villages. The village of Halehsam was chosen to be the new capital of Shabab Rural District after the village of Shabab, The previouse capital was upgraded to a city and was chosen to become the capital city of Shabab District, established on June 30, 2013.

References 

Rural Districts of Ilam Province
Chardavol County